Guillaume Poitevin (2 October 1646 – 26 January 1706) was a French serpent player, maître de chapelle and composer.

Biography 
Born in Boulbon near Tarascon, Poitevin was trained musically in the choir school of Avignon and then entered the chapel of the Aix Cathedral. After a few years as a serpent player, he assumed the functions of maître de chapelle in 1667 for the rest of his life. He was also a teacher of composers including André Campra and Jean Gilles. We know only excerpts of his works today.

He died in Aix-en-Provence

Discography 
The Baroque ensemble    recorded the totality of the work known to date a priori (three incomplete masses out of the four, the third being lost):
 I : "Ave Maria": "Les Maîtres Baroques de Provence / Vol. I" - 1996 - Parnassie éditions]
 II : "Speciosa facta es" et IV : "Dominus tecum": "Les Maîtres Baroques de Provence / Vol. II" - 1999 - Parnassie éditions

References

External links 
 Messe 'Benedicta tu' : 4 voices on Musicalics

1646 births
French Baroque composers
French composers of sacred music
1706 deaths